South Gare is an area of reclaimed land and breakwater on the southern side of the mouth of the River Tees in Redcar and Cleveland, England.
It is accessed by taking the South Gare Road (private road) from Fisherman's Crossing at the western end of Tod Point Road in Warrenby.

Before the building of South Gare, permanent dry land stopped at Tod Point, at the western end of Warrenby and there was only Coatham Sands and the mudflats of Bran Sands.
The creation of South Gare extends this by a further .

The building of South Gare offers a safe harbour in stormy weather to ships off the coast and allowed for the dredging of the River Tees entrance.
South Gare itself was a settlement but the houses there were demolished many years ago.

History

Construction 

Blocks of solid blast furnace slag were cast and moved into position along the banks of the River Tees, then back filled using 70,000 tons of material dredged from river bed.
This canalised the river allowing it to keep itself clean by the action of flow and tides.

The Gare was constructed from January 1861 to 1884
using 5 million tonnes of blast furnace slag and 18,000 tons of cement
at a total cost of £219,393.
The slag was supplied free from Tees-side blast furnaces by ironmasters who paid for its removal.
The north end of the breakwater carrying the lighthouse uses blocks of concrete weighing from 40 up to 300 tons in weight.

Work was planned and supervised by John Fowler, engineer to the Tees Commissioners.
With construction complete, the breakwater was formally opened by the Right Hon W. H. Smith, First Lord of the Treasury on 25 October 1888.

Railway 

To construct South Gare a rail line was built from the Warrenby iron works to carry men and materials. When construction was complete the rail line was used, wind permitting, with a sail bogey to move visitors, servicemen, lifeboatmen and lighthouse crew out to the lighthouse and gun installations close to the end of South Gare.
The rail line still exists in places and is easiest to see near the remains of the coastal battery.

Defences 

The original South Gare battery was built from 1890 to 1892 and fitted with a two gun battery.
New guns were fitted to the battery in 1907 but removed in 1920, and in 1938 the battery was reconstructed and fitted with two larger guns.
The anti-aircraft batteries, and mortar emplacements have been partially demolished.
There are a number of defensive concrete pill boxes still scattered around the area in the dunes and on the beach.

What is now the South Gare Marine Club is the site of a maintenance base for electrically fired submarine mines defending the mouth of the River Tees.

Lifeboat station 

There has been a lifeboat at Teesmouth since 1829
when the RNLI was founded.
The present Teesmouth Lifeboat Station was founded in 1911 and in 1914 a boathouse and slipway was built to launch the lifeboat.
The lifeboat station has had a Tyne class lifeboat since 1986 and in 2003 new lifeboat crew facilities were built however the lifeboat station was closed a few years later with coverage being supplied by Hartlepool lifeboat.

South Gare Lighthouse 

The South Gare Lighthouse was built in 1884 at the end of South Gare breakwater
and is owned and operated by PD Ports.

Coastguard station 

A coastguard station is located south of South Gare Lighthouse.
To the immediate south of the coastguard station is a short steel frame tower.
This tower houses a radar antenna, an automatic fog detector and a vertical set of four sectored red and white leading lights for navigation purposes.
There is second fog detector system mounted on the Fairway Buoy in Tees Bay outside the river entrance.

River entrance 

The water depth at the mouth of the Tees at low tide has altered over the years.
Two suction dredgers and occasionally a grab dredger are used to keep the shipping channel clear.

Tees pilots 

Since 1988 Tees and Hartlepool Port Authority's pilot services for Hartlepool, Teesport and the River Tees have been based at the pilot station at South Gare.

Harbours 

Paddy's Hole is a small harbour constructed from slag in the lagoon on the Teesmouth side of South Gare.
It is named Paddy's Hole because of the many Irishmen who helped build the South Gare.

There are also two smaller harbours south of Paddy's Hole named Guy's Hole and Powder Hole (or Sand Hole).
Between Guy's Hole and Powder Hole is the remains of the Powder Jetty (or Powder Wharf) dating from the First World War or earlier.

Sands 

South Gare & Coatham Sands is a Site of Special Scientific Interest. The dunes on the eastern flank are protected by three slag banks close to the breakwater, known as the German Charlies that are partly exposed at low tide.
The name German Charlies was applied after a First World War incident involving a German ship that ran aground on them.
There is a gas pipeline through the SSSI sand dunes.

On the inner side of the breakwater is Bran Sands known for its bird life and the wooden wreck of a ship in the sands.
A number of underwater wrecks lie off South Gare.

Wildlife 

The land is made from thousands of tons of basic slag from blast furnaces.
The high limestone content of the slag produces a base rich soil that is attractive to lime loving plants.
The area consists of tidal mudflats, scrub, grassland, sand dunes, rocks and freshwater and saltwater pools, and attracts a very wide range of birds.
Seals can also be spotted.

Industry 

Built on the reclaimed land of Bran Sands is the ore terminal, sinter plant, coke plant, and blast furnace of SSI's Teesside Steelworks.
The plant was mothballed in 2010, reopening in April 2012, only to be mothballed again on 28 September 2015, and finally closed on 12 October 2015.
Next to that is Bran Sands Water Treatment Works.

Activities 

As well as those out for a stroll other activities indulged in include sea fishing from small boats and angling from the concrete breakwater, photography of wildlife and shipping etc., also birdwatching,
sailing, kite surfing, windsurfing, jet-skiing, diving and motorcycling.

Proposed developments 

Near the end of the breakwater, in the fenced compound, there is a tall steel framed mast, housing air speed measurement devices.
These devices gather data on wind speeds at various heights for a planned offshore wind farm proposed by Northern Offshore Wind Limited.
AMEC Wind has plans to site 19 wind turbines inside Corus steelworks generating 47.5 MW of electricity.

A giant sculpture of the Right Hand of Friendship was proposed for Redcar and Cleveland, at South Gare, as one of series of artworks called Tees Valley Giants.
In 2012, however, this series of artworks was discontinued.

References

External links 

 Photographs: Fred Brunskill's South Gare photos, Flickr, North York Moors Cam, Doc Brown
 Maps: Streetmap, Wikimapia
 Tides at the River Tees entrance: BBC, Admiralty, Tidetimes.

Breakwaters
Places in the Tees Valley
Buildings and structures in Redcar and Cleveland